The People's Republic of China (PRC) first competed at the IAAF World Championships in Athletics in 1983, at the World Championships in Helsinki.

Medals by World Championships

Medalists

1983
Zhu Jianhua – Bronze – Men's high jump

1987
Yan Hong – Bronze – Women's 10 kilometres walk

1991
Huang Zhihong – Gold – Women's shot put
Xu Demei – Gold – Women's javelin throw
Zhong Huandi – Silver – Women's 10,000 metres
Wang Xiuting – Bronze – Women's 10,000 metres

1993
Liu Dong – Gold – Women's 1500 metres
Qu Yunxia – Gold – Women's 3000 metres
Wang Junxia – Gold – Women's 10,000 metres
Huang Zhihong – Gold – Women's shot put
Zhang Linli – Silver – Women's 3000 metres
Zhong Huandi – Silver – Women's 10,000 metres
Zhang Lirong – Bronze – Women's 3000 metres
Min Chunfeng – Bronze – Women's discus throw

1995
Huang Zhihong – Silver – Women's shot put

1997
None

1999
Liu Hongyu – Gold – Women's 20 kilometres walk
Wang Yan – Silver – Women's 20 kilometres walk

2001
None

2003
Liu Xiang – Bronze – Men's 110 metre hurdles
Sun Yingjie – Bronze – Women's 10,000 metres

2005
Liu Xiang – Silver – Men's 110 metres hurdles

2007
Liu Xiang – Gold – Men's 110 metres hurdles
Zhou Chunxiu – Silver – Women's Marathon
Zhang Wenxiu – Bronze – Women's hammer throw

2009
Bai Xue – Gold – Women's Marathon
Wang Hao – Gold – Men's 20 km race walk competition
Liu Hong – Silver – Women's 20 km race walk competition
Gong Lijiao – Bronze – Women's shot put

2011
Li Yanfeng – Gold – Women's discus throw
Liu Hong – Gold – Women's 20 kilometres walk
Liu Xiang – Silver – Men's 110 metres hurdles
Wang Zhen – Silver – Men's 20 kilometres walk
Zhang Wenxiu – Bronze – Women's hammer throw
Si Tianfeng – Bronze – Men's 50 kilometres walk

2013
Chen Ding – Silver – Men's 20 kilometres walk
Gong Lijiao – Bronze – Women's shot put
Liu Hong – Bronze – Women's 20 kilometres walk
Zhang Wenxiu – Bronze – Women's hammer throw

2015
Liu Hong – Gold – Women's 20 km walk
Gong Lijiao – Silver – Women's shot put
Wang Zhen – Silver – Men's 20 km walk
Zhang Wenxiu – Silver – Women's hammer throw
Lü Xiuzhi – Silver – Women's 20 km walk
Mo YouxueXie ZhenyeSu BingtianZhang Peimeng – Silver – Men's 4 × 100 metres relay
Lü Huihui – Silver – Women's Javelin throw
Zhang Guowei – Silver – Men's high jump
Wang Jianan – Bronze – Men's long jump

2017
Gong Lijiao – Gold – Women's shot put
Yang Jiayu – Gold – Women's 20 km walk
Wang Zheng – Silver – Women's Hammer throw
Li Lingwei – Silver – Women's Javelin throw
Yin Hang – Silver – Women's 50 km walk
Lü Huihui – Bronze – Women's Javelin throw
Yang Shuqing – Bronze – Women's 50 km walk

See also
Olympic medalists for China

External links
http://www.athletics.org.cn/ – Chinese Athletic Association

Athletics in China
Nations at the World Athletics Championships